Mayra Soledad Mendoza (born 26 November 1983) is an Argentine politician who served as National Deputy from 2011 to 2019 and is currently intendenta (mayor) of Quilmes for the Frente de Todos.

Early life 
She was born in a radical family. In her teenage years she taught support classes in a community canteen in her town. She began to be part of La Cámpora group since its creation in 2006, becoming in 2011 the only woman on the national leadership table. Previously, in June 2008, she had been appointed as organizational secretary. She also participated in the founding of the Peronist Youth of Buenos Aires Province. In 2010 she opened a basic unit in her locality.

Political career 
Her first job in politics was with Oscar Batallés, a Quilmes councilor. She later worked as an adviser to the radical senator José Eseverri. She then worked at the Hipódromo de Palermo and the Municipality of Zárate. She has also served as Secretary for Women in the Justicialist Party.

In mid-2009, she was appointed manager of Institutional Relations for the ANSES. In December 2011, she assumed the position of National Deputy for Buenos Aires Province. She was re-elected in 2015.

In 2019, she was nominated as candidate for Mayor of Quilmes. Mayra Mendoza in turn obtained 54.21% of the votes within her space. On October 27 of the same year, she was elected with 49.47% of the votes, becoming the first woman to govern the district.

References 

1983 births
Living people
People from Quilmes Partido
21st-century Argentine politicians
21st-century Argentine women politicians
Members of La Cámpora
Justicialist Party politicians
Members of the Argentine Chamber of Deputies elected in Buenos Aires Province
Mayors of Quilmes
Women members of the Argentine Chamber of Deputies
Women mayors of places in Argentina